Zhongbei is a town in Xiqing District, in the western suburbs of Tianjin, People's Republic of China. , it had 11 residential communities and 23 villages under its administration.

See also
 List of township-level divisions of Tianjin

References
xzqh.org

Towns in Tianjin